Yours is the debut studio album recorded by American country pop singer and songwriter Russell Dickerson. It was released on October 13, 2017, through Triple Tigers Records. Produced by Casey Brown, the record follows Dickerson's 2016 EP of the same name. Its lead single, the title track, has been certified 3× Platinum by the RIAA.

Content
Yours includes five tracks previously released on the similarly titled extended play. An alternate "wedding version" of the title track is included as the final track on both releases. "Blue Tacoma" has received some unsolicited airplay on country radio. The song titled "MGNO" is an initialism for "my girl's night out." Dickerson co-wrote every song on the album.

Commercial performance
Yours debuted at No. 5 on the Top Country Albums chart and No. 39 on the Billboard 200, selling 7,600 copies (12,000 units including streams and track sales) in the first week. The album has sold 15,600 copies in the United States as of February 2018.

Singles
The title track, "Yours", serves as the lead single. It was first released independently as a digital single on July 23, 2015, and was later serviced to country radio on April 24, 2017, after Dickerson signed with Triple Tigers Records. The song has reached the top of the Country Airplay chart and the top 50 of the Hot 100.

"Blue Tacoma" was released to radio on March 5, 2018, as the album's second single.

"Every Little Thing" was released to radio on December 3, 2018, as the third single.

Track listing

Personnel
Adapted by AllMusic

Roy Agee - trombone
Hank Bentley - electric guitar, keyboards, mandolin
Casey Brown - banjo, acoustic guitar, keyboards, programming, synthesizer, ukulele, background vocals, whistle
Vinnie Ciesielski - trumpet
Jeff Coffin - saxophone
Bryan Dawley - acoustic guitar
Andrew Mendelson - masterer, unknown

Russell Dickerson - banjo, snare drum, acoustic guitar, electric guitar, lead vocals
Kris Donegan - dobro, electric guitar
Melinda Doolittle - background vocals
David Dorn - keyboards
Hannah Ellis - background vocals
Cara Fox - cello, violin, string arrangements
Chris Lacorte - electric guitar
Tim Lauer - keyboards
Stephen Leiweke - acoustic guitar, electric guitar
Tony Lucido - bass guitar
Rob McNelley - electric guitar, electric sitar
Dan Needham - drums, programming
Adam Ollendorff - pedal steel guitar
Danny Rader - banjo, bouzouki, acoustic guitar, mandolin
Jordan Reynolds - keyboards, programming, background vocals
Kevin Rooney - programming
Jimmie Lee Sloas - banjo, bass guitar, acoustic guitar
Keith Smith - horn arrangements, trumpet
Matt Stanfield - Hammond B-3 organ, keyboards, programming, synthesizer
Aaron Sterling - drums, percussion
Tyler Summers - saxophone
Travis Toy - dobro, pedal steel guitar
Oscar Utterström - trombone
Parker Welling - background vocals
Derek Wells - electric guitar
Emoni Wilkins - background vocals

Charts

Weekly charts

Year-end charts

Certifications

References

2017 debut albums
Russell Dickerson albums
Thirty Tigers albums